John III the Good (in Breton Yann III, in French Jean III; 8 March 128630 April 1341) was Duke of Brittany, from 1312 to his death and 5th Earl of Richmond from 1334 to his death. He was the son of Arthur II, Duke of Brittany, and his first wife Marie, Viscountess of Limoges. John was strongly opposed to his father's second marriage to Yolande and attempted to contest its legality.

In 1297, John married Isabella of Valois, eldest child of Charles, Count of Valois and his first wife Margaret of Naples. At the time of their marriage John was eleven years old and his bride five. She died childless in 1309.

In 1310, John married his second wife, Isabella of Castile. She died childless in 1328.

In 1329, John married his third wife Joan of Savoy. He predeceased his third wife by three years and died childless. He was unwilling to cede the Duchy of Brittany to his half-brother John of Montfort, son of his hated step-mother Yolande. He wished to leave the duchy to the french King Philip VI, but his nobles objected. The marriage of his niece Joanna of Dreux to Charles of Blois gave Charles a plausible claim to the duchy, but the matter was unresolved at John's death.

After his death, John of Montfort claimed his rights as duke of Brittany, but King Philip VI supported the Blois faction, and the Breton War of Succession (1341–1364) was triggered. The Breton Civil War was fought between the House of Blois and the House of Montfort. It became part of the Hundred Years' War, as England supported the Montfort faction, which won, against the House of Blois, which was supported by France.

Arms

See also
Dukes of Brittany family tree

References

Sources

External links
 Inquisition Post Mortem #355, dated 1341.

Brittany, John III, Duke of
Brittany, John III, Duke of
13th-century Breton people
14th-century dukes of Brittany
14th-century peers of France
14th-century English nobility
Dukes of Brittany
Earls of Richmond (1268 creation)
House of Dreux